Balthasar Schneider (born 27 November 1984, in Egg) is an Austrian ski jumper who won the Ski jumping Continental Cup in 2006-07. Schneider has competed in the World Cup forty times. He debuted in Innsbruck 2009 as a member of the National team. His best individual placement in the World cup is a 12th place in Oslo, Holmenkollen 2007. He has two silver medals from team competitions in the Junior World championships.

References

Austrian male ski jumpers
1984 births
Living people
People from Bregenz District
Sportspeople from Vorarlberg